This list includes individuals self-identified as African Americans who have made prominent contributions to the field of law in the United States, especially as eminent judges or legal scholars.  Individuals who may have obtained law degrees or practiced law, but whose reasons for notability are not closely related to that profession, are generally not listed here.

Attorneys and legal scholars

Judicial officers 
This is a dynamic list of African Americans who are or were judges, magistrate judges, court commissioners, or administrative law judges. If known, it will be listed if a judge has served on multiple courts.

See also

List of African-American federal judges
List of Asian American jurists
List of Hispanic/Latino American jurists
List of Jewish American jurists
List of LGBT jurists in the United States
List of Native American jurists
List of first women lawyers and judges in the United States
List of first minority male lawyers and judges in the United States

References

Bibliography

Lists of African-American people
Lists of American legal professionals